The 1939 Batley and Morley by-election was a parliamentary by-election held in the United Kingdom on 9 March 1939 for the House of Commons constituency of Batley and Morley in the West Riding of Yorkshire.

Vacancy 
The Labour Party MP for the seat Willie Brooke died on 21 January 1939 at the age of 44. He had been the MP since the 1935 general election.

Electoral history
This was a traditional Labour/Liberal marginal until 1931 when no Liberal candidate stood and a Conservative won for the first time in the National Government landslide. Brooke comfortably regained the seat at the last election;

Candidates 

 The Labour Party selected Hubert Beaumont to defend the seat. From 1914 to 1925, Beaumont was a member of Derbyshire County Council. He began fighting Parliamentary seats at Aldershot in the 1924 general election, and Harrow in the 1929 general election. In the 1931 general election he was chosen for the winnable seat of Peckham where the sitting MP John Beckett had split from the Labour Party. Beaumont was elected to Yiewsley and West Drayton Urban District Council in 1934. 
 The Conservative Party re-selected 41-year-old Wilfrid Dewhurst Wills from Bath. He had gained the seat from Labour at the 1931 general election before losing the seat back to Labour at the 1935 general election. 
 The Liberal Party already had a prospective parliamentary candidate in place before the vacancy occurred. They had selected Ernest E Dalton, who had contested Sheffield Park at the 1929 general election, but had not fought a parliamentary election since. He was a retired police officer who became the Business Manager of the Leeds Art Centre. Dalton was a supporter of the Popular Front that was being advocated by leading Labour Party politician Sir Stafford Cripps. Cripps argued that the best way of rallying support against the National Government's Nazi appeasement policy was for the Labour and Liberal Parties to support joint candidates. To this end, Dalton said that he was prepared to withdraw his candidature for the by-election if the Labour Party candidate also withdrew, to support a Popular Front candidate standing as an Independent Progressive. Dalton even suggested a potential candidate, the author J. B. Priestley. Priestley had recently said that he would be prepared to seek election to Parliament as an Independent Progressive.

Result

Aftermath 
In the 1945 general election,

References

1939 elections in the United Kingdom
1939 in England
By-elections to the Parliament of the United Kingdom in Leeds constituencies
Elections in Kirklees
1930s in Leeds
1930s in Yorkshire